Mark Halsel (born November 8, 1962) is a member of the Northeastern University athletics Hall of Fame. Halsel was elected for his exploits in basketball.

Halsel played for the Huskies from 1981 to 1984 and when his career was over he had the most rebounds in school history (1,115), and is the only NU player to top both 1,000 points (1,651) and 1,000 rebounds. Halsel also holds the distinction for being on the first ever NCAA men's basketball tournament team in the 1981 season.

Halsel was a two time All-New England selection, along with being All-East, All-District, and Honorable Mention All-American.

Bobby Knight invited Halsel to the 1984 Olympic Trials where he was beat out by Michael Jordan and Chris Mullin for a spot on the squad.

Halsel played professional basketball around the world for seven seasons after leaving Northeastern and was a 1984 NBA Draft pick of the Chicago Bulls in the 4th round.

References

External links
 GoNU.com Hall of Fame Profile 

1962 births
Living people
Bay State Bombardiers players
Chicago Bulls draft picks
Detroit Spirits players
Grand Rapids Hoops players
Lancaster Lightning players
Northeastern Huskies men's basketball players
Power forwards (basketball)
Basketball players from Pittsburgh
American men's basketball players